Ashtapadis or Ashtapadi refers to the Sanskrit hymns of the Gita Govinda, composed by Jayadeva in the 12th century. The ashtapadis, which describe the beauty of Lord Krishna and the love between Krishna and the gopis, are considered a masterpiece in esoteric spirituality and the theme of 'Divine romance'. The literal meaning of ashtapathi, 'eight-steps', refers to the fact that each hymn is made of eight couplets (eight sets of two lines). It is also the source of the word ashtāpada, an Indian board game, the forerunner of chess. Although the original tunes of the ashtapadis were lost in history, they remain popular and are widely sung in a variety of tunes, and used in classical dance performances, across India. Ashtapadis are regularly performed at Kerala temples in the accompaniment of an idakka; a genre of music called sopana sangeetham.

The lyrical poetry of the Gita Govinda is divided into twelve chapters, each of which is sub-divided into twenty four divisions called Prabandha. The Prabandhas contain couplets grouped into eights, called ashtapadis.
Melody type
Rasa (aesthetics)
Works of Jayadeva

List of Ashtapadis
Today, the ashtapadis are sung in a variety of tunes and the list below is just a sample of some of the raga scales used. The original tunes of the ashtapadis are unknown and likely lost in history.

 1. pralaya payodhi jale (jaya jagadisha hare) - Sowrashtram
 2. shrita kamalā kucha-mandala (jaya jaya deva hare) - Bhairavi
 3. lalita lavanga-latā parishilana (viharati harir-iha) - Huseni / Vasantha
 4. chandana charchita nila kalevara - Panthuvarali
 5. sancharad-adhara sudhā madhura (rāse harim-iha) - Thodi
 6. nibhruta nikunja gruham - Kambhoji
 7. mām iyam chalitā vilokya - Bhupalam
 8. nindati chandanam indu-kirañam (sā virahe tava dinā) - Sowrashtram (also Dwijavanthi)
 9. stana-vinihitam api hāram udāram - Bilahari
10. vahati malaya samire (tava virahe vanamāli) - Anandabhairavi
11. rati-sukha-sāre gatam abhisāre (dhira samire yamunā tire) - Kedaragowla or Pahadi
12. pashyati dishi dishi (nātha hare) - Sankarabharanam
13. kathita samayepi - Ahiri
14. smara-samaro-chita virachita veshā - Saranga
15. samudita madane ramañi vadane - Saveri
16. anila tarala kuvalaya nayanena  - Punnagavarali   
17. rajani janita guru-jāgara (yāhi mādhava yāhi keshava mā vada) - Arabhi
18. harir-abhisarati vahati - Yadukulakamboji
19. vadasi yadi kinchid-api (priye chārushile muncha) - Mukhaari
20. virachita chātu-vachana rachanam - Kalyani
21. manju-tara kunja tala keli sadane (vilasa) -     Ghanta
22. rādhā vadana vilokana             -    Madhyamavati
23. kishalaya shayana tale       -     Nadhanamakriya  
24. kuru yadu-nandana (nijagāda sā) -     Suruti / Chakravaham

References

External links

 www.odia.org Oriya (Odia) Gita Govinda
 http://www.sangeetasudha.org/jayadeva/index.html
 https://gitagovinda.wordpress.com/
 lyrics of ashtapathi
 Jayadeva Ashtapathi/Geetha Govindam Lyrics in Carnatic/Bhajanais

Carnatic music
Jayadeva

lt:Gitagovinda